Dato' Ong Beng Seng ( born January 1946) is a Singapore-based Malaysian billionaire businessman and husband of Christina Ong. He is the founder of the Singapore-based organisation Hotel Properties, and a shareholder in many businesses. Forbes estimates the net worth of Ong and his wife at $1.8 billion (as of July 2014), making them the 15th richest people in Singapore.

Early life
Ong was born in January 1946, in Malaysia. When he was four years old, his family relocated to Singapore. His career began when he joined an insurance firm for ships. In 1975, he joined Kuo International, founded by businessman Peter Fu Yun Siak and there he met his later-to-be spouse, Christina.

Career
After beginning his trading career at Kuo International, Ong went on to found his own firm, Hotel Properties Limited. Today, he controls many businesses, including a few based in Bond Street in London, and his investments are worth tens of millions of dollars. He is a well-established hotelier, having bought and built many hotels worldwide. Ong is credited as one among the few who brought  the Singapore Grand Prix to the country, the first Formula One night race.

Personal life
A "glitzy figure in Singapore and abroad", Ong is married to Christina Ong (née Fu), the daughter of a businessman. They have two children, a daughter and a son. Ong was described by Hilary Clarke of The Independent as "media shy" and "notoriously secretive". Despite that, he is known to be well-acquainted with many Hollywood celebrities.

Wealth
Ong's business approach is to "[buy when rents and properties are cheap and sell when they are not." As of July 2012, the Ong family, comprising Ong and his wife, is worth $1.6 billion, based on estimates by Forbes, making the couple Singapore's 10th richest persons.

References

1946 births
Living people
Singaporean billionaires
Singaporean businesspeople